This is a list of episodes for Season 16 of Late Night with Conan O'Brien, which aired from September 2, 2008, to February 20, 2009.

Series overview

Season 16

References 

Late Night with Conan O'Brien